The Junggar or Dzungaria oil fields are the oil and gas fields of northern Xinjiang Autonomous Region, China.  They include the Karamay oil field in Karamay that started production in 1955. 

The Junggar oil fields are one of the three largest oil fields in Xinjiang, the other two being the Tuha in the Turpan and Hami Basins, and the Tarim oil fields in the Tarim Basin. The Junggar fields include such oil fields as:

Karamay oil field

Mahe oil field (瑪河油田)

See also
Tarim oil fields
Tuha oil fields
West–East Gas Pipeline

References

外部リンク

Oil fields in China

Oil fields in China
Geography of Xinjiang